This is a list of appointments by the 8th National Assembly:

General 
National Assembly according to the Constitution and laws appoints:

Appointments

Nominations

Expected nominations during the term 
2018:

 Governor of the Bank of Slovenia (Governor Boštjan Jazbec named member of the Single Resolution Board) - proposed by President of the Republic
 Judge of the Constitutional Court (term of President and Judge Jadranka Sovdat ends on 18 December 2018) - proposed by President of the Republic

2019:

 Human Rights Ombudsman (term of Ombudsman Vlasta Nussdorfer ends on 22 February 2019) - proposed by President of the Republic
 Judge of the Constitutional Court (term of Judge Etelka Korpič-Horvat ends on 27 September 2019) - proposed by President of the Republic

2020:

 Judge of the Constitutional Court (term of Judge Dunja Jadek Pensa ends on 14 July 2020) - proposed by President of the Republic

2021:

 Vice-Governor of the Bank of Slovenia (term of Vice-Governor Irena Vodopivec Jean ends on 6 October 2021) - proposed by President of the Republic

2022:

 First Deputy President of the Court of Audit (term of First Deputy President Jorg Kristijan Petrovič ends on 31 January 2022) - proposed by President of the Republic
 Vice-Governor of the Bank of Slovenia (term of Vice-Governor Marko Bošnjak ends on 4 March 2022) - proposed by President of the Republic
 Vice-Governor of the Bank of Slovenia (term of Vice-Governor Primož Dolenc ends on 5 April 2022) - proposed by President of the Republic
 President of the Court of Audit (term of President Tomaž Vesel ends on 23 April 2022) - proposed by President of the Republic

References 

Government of Slovenia
Lists of political office-holders in Slovenia
Slovenian government officials